Gregory A. Biscone is a retired lieutenant general of the U.S. Air Force.  He last served as the Inspector General of the Air Force assigned within the Office of the Secretary of the Air Force, Washington, D.C. and retired on 1 July 2016.

Biscone is a 1981 distinguished graduate of the U.S. Air Force Academy. His assignments include combat crew instructor duty and wing command in the B-52; squadron, group and wing command in the B-2; advanced systems acquisition; and aide to the Commander, Air Combat Command. He also led the Joint Staff's Force Integration Branch, directed the Headquarters U.S. Executive Secretariat, and served as ACC's assistant director of air and space operations. He has also been deputy director of operations, U.S. Central Command, and director of Air Force Quadrennial Defense Review, Headquarters U.S. Air Force.

Biscone commanded expeditionary forces and flew B-52 missions in Operations Desert Storm and Enduring Freedom. He also commanded B-2 actions in support of Operation Iraqi Freedom with strikes from both continental United States and deployed locations.  He is a command pilot with more than 3,800 hours.

Previous to being the IG, he was commander of the Office of the Defense Representative, Pakistan.  He was the senior military representative in Pakistan and in concert with the U.S. Embassy Country Team, promoted and enhanced U.S. security goals by assisting Pakistan military counterinsurgency efforts by building capacity and developing relationships with Pakistan military to strengthen and perpetuate a resilient and mutually beneficial defense relationship with Pakistan.  From 2014 to 2016, as IG, he reported to the Secretary and Chief of Staff of the Air Force on matters concerning Air Force effectiveness, efficiency, and the military discipline of active duty, Air Force Reserve and Air National Guard forces.

Flight information
Rating: Command pilot 
Flight hours: More than 3,800 
Aircraft flown: T-38, B-52, B-2

Education
1981 Bachelor's degree in economics, United States Air Force Academy, Colorado Springs, Colorado
1986 Squadron Officer School, Maxwell AFB, Alabama
1992 Master of Business Administration degree in aviation, Embry-Riddle Aeronautical University, Florids
1993 Air Command and Staff College, Maxwell AFB, Alabama
1999 Master's degree in national security strategy, National War College, Fort Lesley J. McNair, Washington, D.C.
2001 Senior Executive Fellowship, Harvard University, Cambridge, Massachusetts

Assignments
 July 1981 – August 1982, student, undergraduate pilot training, Laughlin AFB, Texas
 August 1982 – December 1982, student, Combat Crew Training School, Carswell AFB, Texas
 January 1983 – July 1985, line and evaluator co-pilot, 60th Bomb Squadron, Andersen AFB, Guam
 August 1985 – July 1988, aircraft commander, squadron flight scheduler, instructor pilot and Chief of Bomber Training, 416th Bomb Wing, Griffiss AFB, New York
 August 1988 – September 1991, line instructor, aircraft commander, standards and evaluations pilot, and Strategic Air Command instrument school instructor pilot, 93rd Bomb Wing, Castle AFB, California
 September 1991 – June 1992, acquisition officer, Headquarters SAC, Offutt AFB, Nebraska
 August 1992 – June 1993, student, Air Command and Staff College, Maxwell AFB, Alabama
 July 1993 – July 1995, aide to the commander of Air Combat Command, Langley AFB, Virginia
 August 1995 – March 1997, operations officer, 393rd Bomb Squadron, Whiteman AFB, Missouri
 April 1997 – June 1998, commander of 393rd Bomb Squadron, Whiteman AFB, Missouri
 August 1998 – June 1999, student, National War College, Fort Lesley J. McNair, Washington, D.C.
 June 1999 – April 2001, chief of Force Integration Branch, Joint Staff, the Pentagon, Washington, D.C.
 April 2001 – December 2001, director, Executive Secretariat, Headquarters U.S. Air Force, Washington, D.C.
 December 2001 – July 2003, commander of 509th Operations Group, Whiteman AFB, Missouri
 July 2003 – June 2005, commander of 5th Bomb Wing, Minot AFB, North Dakota
 June 2005 – May 2006, assistant director of air and space operations, Headquarters ACC, Langley AFB, Virginia
 May 2006 – September 2007, commander of 509th Bomb Wing, Whiteman AFB, Missouri
 September 2007 – May 2009, deputy director of operations, U.S. Central Command, MacDill Air Force Base, Florida
 May 2009 – February 2010, director of Air Force Quadrennial Defense Review, Office of the Assistant Vice Chief of Staff, Headquarters U.S. Air Force, Washington, D.C.
 February 2010 – February 2011, chief of staff, Secretary of Defense Comprehensive Review Working Group, Washington, D.C.
 February 2011 – January 2013, director of global operations, U.S. Strategic Command, Offutt AFB, Nebraska
 January 2013 – August 2014, commander of Office of the Defense Representative, Pakistan, U.S. Embassy, Islamabad, Pakistan
 August 2014 – May 2016, Inspector General of the Air Force, Office of the Secretary of the Air Force, Washington, D.C

Awards and decorations

Effective dates of promotion
Second lieutenant May 27, 1981
First lieutenant May 27, 1983
Captain May 27, 1985
Major April 1, 1993
Lieutenant colonel January 1, 1997
Colonel April 1, 2001
Brigadier general August 1, 2007
Major general May 19, 2010
Lieutenant general January 12, 2013

External links

 GREGORY A. BISCONE Biography

References

Year of birth missing (living people)
Living people
United States Air Force Academy alumni
Embry–Riddle Aeronautical University alumni
United States Air Force generals
Recipients of the Defense Distinguished Service Medal
Recipients of the Air Force Distinguished Service Medal
Recipients of the Distinguished Flying Cross (United States)
Recipients of the Legion of Merit
Recipients of the Air Medal
Harvard Business School people